The following outline is provided as an overview of and topical guide to organic gardening and farming:

Organic farming – alternative agricultural system that relies on fertilizers of organic origin such as compost, manure, green manure, and bone meal and places emphasis on techniques such as crop rotation and companion planting. Biological pest control, mixed cropping and the fostering of insect predators are encouraged. In general, organic standards are designed to allow the use of naturally occurring substances while prohibiting or strictly limiting synthetic substances.

Organic farming and gardening systems and approaches 

 Biodynamic farming
 Biodynamic gardening
 Climate-friendly gardening
 Forest gardening
 History of organic farming
 Organic farming
 Organic gardening (Organic horticulture)
Organic lawn management
 Permaculture
 Square foot gardening
 Synergistic gardening
 System of Rice Intensification
 Vegan organic gardening
 Wildlife gardening

Principles of organic gardening and farming 

 Principles of Organic Agriculture
 The Principle of Health – "Organic agriculture should sustain and enhance the health of soil, plant, animal and human as one and indivisible."
 The Principle of Ecology – "Organic agriculture should be based on living ecological systems and cycles, work with them, emulate them and help sustain them."
 The Principle of Fairness – "Organic agriculture should build on relationships that ensure fairness with regard to the common environment and life opportunities."
 The Principle of Care – "Organic agriculture should be managed in a precautionary and responsible manner to protect the health and well being of current and future generations and the environment."

The ornamental organic garden 
 List of flowers
 Organic lawn management

Organic gardening and farming techniques 

 Aquaponics
 Companion planting
 List of companion plants
 Compost
 Biofertilizer
 Intercropping
 Managed intensive rotational grazing
 Multiple cropping
 No dig gardening
 Pollination management
 Sheet mulching
 Square foot gardening
 Succession planting
 Sustainable agriculture
 Weed control techniques (see also 'weeds' below)
Stale seed bed
 Xeriscaping (water wise gardening)
Greywater irrigation
 Neglected crops
 Underutilized crops

History of organic gardening and farming 

History of organic farming

Pests and diseases 

 Integrated pest management
 Biological pest control
 Disease resistance in fruit and vegetables
 Physiological plant disorders (i.e., plant disorders caused by environmental factors, such as weather conditions, nutrient deficiencies, etc.)
Nutrient deficiencies
Boron deficiency
Calcium deficiency
Iron deficiency
Magnesium deficiency
Manganese deficiency
Nitrogen deficiency
Phosphorus deficiency
Potassium deficiency
 Plant pathology (i.e., plant diseases caused by fungi, viruses, bacteria, etc.)
Honey fungus
Rust (fungus)
Specific replant disease

Weeds 
 Indicator plants
 Dynamic accumulator

Organic publications

Organic organizations 

 Organic Crop Improvement Association
 Good Gardeners Association (UK)
 Garden Organic, formerly the Henry Doubleday Research Association (main organisation promoting organic gardening in the UK)
 International Federation of Organic Agriculture Movements (IFOAM)
 Permaculture Association (Britain)
 Rodale Institute
 Soil Association (UK)
 Certified Naturally Grown
 Vegan Organic Network
 World-Wide Opportunities on Organic Farms (WWOOF)
 Carolina Farm Stewardship Association For North and South Carolina, of the US, the leading organic farming advocacy and certification institution.
 Biodynamic Farming & Gardening Association
 Irish Organic Farmers and Growers Association (IOFGA) Organic certification and promotion body in Ireland.
 Maine Organic Farmers and Gardeners Association (MOFGA)

Some important figures in organic farming and gardening 

 Lady Eve Balfour
 Louis Bromfield
 Peter Caddy
 Alan Chadwick
 Charles III
 Jim Cochran
 Eliot Coleman
 Dr Shewell Cooper
 Bob Flowerdew
 Masanobu Fukuoka
 Howard Garrett
 Geoff Hamilton
 Robert Hart
 Emilia Hazelip
 Lawrence D Hills
 David Holmgren
 Sir Albert Howard
 Dan Jason
 Bill Mollison
 Helen and Scott Nearing
 Michelle Obama
 Airi Ōtsu, Japanese organic farmer
 Prince Philip
 J. I. Rodale
 Viktor Schauberger
 Ruth Stout

See also 

 Aquaponics
 Botany
 Community-supported agriculture
 Farmers' markets
 List of countries with organic agriculture regulation
 List of organic food topics
 Local food
 Organic certification
 Organic cotton
 Organic food
 Organic horticulture
 Organic movement
 Orthodox seed
 Recalcitrant seed
 Terra preta
 Wildcrafting

 Related lists
 List of environment topics
 List of ethics topics
 List of sustainable agriculture topics
 Urban economics

References

External links 

organic gardening and farming
organic gardening and farming
Organic gardening and farming
Organic
Organic gardening
 
 
Organic gardening
Organic gardening